Kyle Reifers (born October 13, 1983) is an American professional golfer who currently plays on the PGA Tour.

Amateur career
Reifers was born in Columbus, Ohio and played college golf at Wake Forest University. He won the Monroe Invitational and Ohio Amateur in 2004 and the Northeast Amateur in 2005. Reifers represented the United States at the 2005 Walker Cup where the US won 12–11. He was the runner-up at the 2006 NCAA Division I Men's Golf Championships.

Professional career
Reifers turned professional in 2006. He picked up his first professional victory on the Egolf Tarheel Tour at the Charlotte National Open only one week after his runner-up finish at the NCAA Men's Golf Championships. He picked up his second professional victory the following week at the Chattanooga Classic on the Nationwide Tour. He became the 11th player in Tour history to win his first career start and the 19th to win on Tour as a Monday qualifier. He earned his PGA Tour card for 2007 by finish T29 in qualifying school in 2006. In his rookie season on tour he made 9 of 27 cuts. He played on the Nationwide Tour/Web.com Tour in 2006, 2008–11, and 2013–14. He played on the PGA Tour in 2007, 2012, and 2015. In 2015, Reifers had three eagles on the back nine in the final round of the Barracuda Championship to shoot for 22 points and tie the leader, J. J. Henry. Reifers lost the playoff to Henry's eagle on the second playoff hole.

Personal life
Reifers father, Randy, played golf at DePauw University and was inducted into the Ohio Golf Hall of Fame. Both his father and mother, Alison, have won Ohio State Amateur tournaments. His father played on the same college golf team as former Vice President Dan Quayle and golf analyst Mark Rolfing.

Amateur wins (3)
2004 Monroe Invitational, Ohio Amateur
2005 Northeast Amateur

Professional wins (3)

Nationwide Tour wins (1)

Nationwide Tour playoff record (1–0)

Tarheel Tour wins (1)
2006 Charlotte National Open

Other wins (1)

Playoff record
PGA Tour playoff record (0–1)

U.S. national team appearances
Amateur
Walker Cup: 2005 (winners)

See also
2006 PGA Tour Qualifying School graduates
2011 Nationwide Tour graduates
2014 Web.com Tour Finals graduates

External links

Profile on Wake Forest's official athletic site

American male golfers
Wake Forest Demon Deacons men's golfers
PGA Tour golfers
Korn Ferry Tour graduates
Golfers from Columbus, Ohio
Golfers from Charlotte, North Carolina
1983 births
Living people